Augustin-Jean Fresnel (1788–1827) was a physicist.

Fresnel may also refer to:
 Fresnel (frequency), a formerly used unit equal to one terahertz
 Rimae Fresnel, an escarpment on the moon
 Fresnel lens, a type of composite compact lens
 , a French Navy submarine launched in 1908 and sunk in 1915
 , a French Navy submarine launched in 1932 and sunk in 1944

People with the surname
 Fulgence Fresnel (1795–1855), French Orientalist and brother of Augustin-Jean Fresnel

See also
 
 

French-language surnames